The Benson Medal is a medal awarded by the Royal Society of Literature in the UK.

It was founded in 1916 by A. C. Benson who was a Fellow of the Society, to honour those who produce "meritorious works in poetry, fiction, history, and belles-lettres". The medal has been awarded several times to writers in other languages, and is occasionally awarded those who are not writers, but who have done conspicuous service to literature.

The medal is awarded at irregular intervals for lifelong achievement. Recipients include:
Edmund Blunden,
Anita Desai,
Maureen Duffy,
E. M. Forster,
Christopher Fry,
John Gawsworth,
Nadine Gordimer,
Philip Larkin,
R. K. Narayan
A. L. Rowse,
George Santayana,
Wole Soyinka,
Lytton Strachey,
J. R. R. Tolkien, and
Helen Waddell.

In November 2020, the new design for the medal by Linda Crook was unveiled. The design includes books on one side, and people on the other.

Recent recipients

2022 
 Sandra Agard

2021 
 Alastair Niven

2020 

 Boyd Tonkin

2019 
 Susheila Nasta

2018 

 Liz Calder

2017
Margaret Busby
Carmen Callil
Mary-Kay Wilmers

2016
Christopher MacLehose

2015
Nancy Sladek

2014
Deirdre Le Faye
Valentina Polukhina

2013
Wm. Roger Louis

2012
David Pease
Jenny Uglow

2011
Diana Athill
Francis King

Earlier recipients

 2010: Al Alvarez
 2009: Mark Le Fanu; Kay Dunbar
 2008: John Saumarez Smith; Douglas Matthews
 2007: Nadine Gordimer
 2006: Ronald Blythe; Joan Winterkorn – manuscript expert
 2005: Edward Upward
 2004: Maureen Duffy; James Parker
 2003: Anita Desai ; David Sutton
 2000: Christopher Fry
 1996: Shusaku Endo
 1993: Julien Green
 1990: Wole Soyinka ;
 1989: Anthony Burgess ; Nadine Gordimer
 1982: A. L. Rowse
 1981: Sir Sacheverell Sitwell ; Odysseas Elytis
 1979: R. K. Narayan
 1975: Philip Larkin
 1969: Cecil Woodham-Smith
 1966: J. R. R. Tolkien ; Rebecca West ; E. V. Rieu
 1952: Frederick S. Boas
 1941: Christopher La Farge
 1940: Christopher Hassall ; John Gawsworth
 1939: F. L. Lucas ; Andrew Young ;
 1938: E. M. Forster ; G. M. Young
 1934: Edith Sitwell
 1931: Stella Benson ; Siegfried Sassoon
 1930: Edmund Blunden
 1927: Frederick Arthur Simpson ; Helen Waddell
 1926: Percy Lubbock ; Robert Wilson Lynd ; Harold Nicolson
 1925: Gordon Bottomley ; George Santayana
 1923: Lytton Strachey
 1917: Gabriele d'Annunzio ; Benito Pérez Galdós ; Maurice Barres

References

External links
 "The Benson Medal" at The Royal Society of Literature website.

Royal Society of Literature awards
Awards established in 1916
1916 establishments in the United Kingdom
Literary awards honoring lifetime achievement
British literary awards